FC Botev Lukovit is a Bulgarian football club from Lukovit, currently playing in the Bulgarian "A" RFG Lovech. The stadium of the club is The City Stadium in Lukovit with capacity of 3,000 people.

History 
	
Botev Lukovit Football Club was founded in 1933, but in 1995 due to lack of funds the club wound up.

Is restored again on 1 September 1999 and included in the Lovech Regional championship or the Fourth level of the Bulgarian football.

Management Board decided to direct their activities to the generation of adolescents and directs its activities to work with children. In the club are recorded 50 children divided into two groups: training group – (from 9 to 11 years), children (12–14 years) and adolescents aged senior (15–19) in the Regional Championship.

Children's age group for the season 2000–2001 finished in the first place in their league. One of the big successes achieved in children participating was in the International tournament "Danone", when the children of Botev Lukovit reached the final in Sofia. By the way they eliminated teams like Litex Lovech, Lokomotiv Gorna Oryahovitsa and Etar Veliko Tarnovo.

Four of the children – Rosen Banov, Vladislav Simeonov, Milen Tonev and Plamen Stanev were included in the national team "Danone" – 2000, for the international finals of the tournament on stadium "Park de Prince" in Paris.

For season 2013/2014 the team won the right to play in the Bulgarian North-West V AFG.

Successes 
 2nd in Central "V" Group in 1982
 1st in "A" RFG Lovech in 1987, 1988, 2004
 1st in the Christmas football tournament for children in Lovech – 2007, 2008
 1/32 Final of the Bulgarian Cup – 1978
 Botev Lukovit – Litex Lovech 3:0 – 1999
 3rd in North-West V AFG in 2013-14
 Botev Lukovit – Spartak Pleven 1:0 – 15 September 2013
 Botev Lukovit – SFC Etar Veliko Tarnovo 2:0 – 23 May 2014

Current squad 
As of 11 August 2017

See also 
 Official Facebook page
 Site of Lukovit

Football clubs in Bulgaria
Association football clubs established in 1999
1999 establishments in Bulgaria